Bateson's cube is a model of the cost–benefit analysis for animal research developed by Professor Patrick Bateson, president of the Zoological Society of London.

Bateson's cube evaluates proposed research through three criteria:

 the degree of animal suffering,
 the quality of the research,
 the potential medical benefit.

Bateson suggested that research that does not meet these requirements should not be approved or performed, in accordance with the Animals (Scientific Procedures) Act 1986. It is not intended as a formal model for optimal trade-offs, but rather a tool for making judicial decisions, since the three axes are not in a common currency. The third criterion also does not necessarily have to be medical benefit, but could be a wider form of utility.

Batesin cube has three axes measuring suffering, certainty of benefit, and quality of research. If the research is high-quality, certain to be beneficial, and not going to inflict suffering, then it will fall into the hollow section meaning research should proceed. Painful, low-quality research with lower likelihood of success will be lower back in the solid area, and should not proceed. Most research will not be clear-cut, but the guiding principle is 'hollow' should continue, 'solid' should not.

References

Animal testing